Zonguldak is an electoral district of the Grand National Assembly of Turkey. It elects 5 members of parliament (deputies) to represent the province of the same name for a four-year term by the D'Hondt method, a party-list proportional representation system.

Members 
Population reviews of each electoral district are conducted before each general election, which can lead to certain districts being granted a smaller or greater number of parliamentary seats. Zonguldak was once represented by as many as twelve MPs, although this has dropped today to five seats, its lowest level yet.

General elections

June 2015

2011

Presidential elections

2014

References 

Electoral districts of Turkey
Politics of Zonguldak Province